St. Louis College Valenzuela, formerly known as Philippine College of Technological Resources (PCTR) is a private school located at Maysan Road, Valenzuela City, Philippines.

Politician and celebrity, Shalani Soledad, comic journalist, Marc Logan, and volleyball player Cha Cruz,  are among its well-known high school alumni.

External links

 

Private schools in Metro Manila
Universities and colleges in Metro Manila
Education in Valenzuela, Metro Manila
Educational institutions established in 1976
1976 establishments in the Philippines